New Jersey's 25th Legislative District is one of 40 in the New Jersey Legislature. As of the 2011 apportionment, the district includes the Morris County municipalities of Boonton Town, Boonton Township, Chester Borough, Chester Township, Denville Township, Dover Town, Mendham Borough, Mendham Township, Mine Hill Township, Morris Township, Morristown, Mount Arlington, Mountain Lakes, Netcong, Randolph Township, Rockaway Borough, Roxbury Township, Victory Gardens, Washington Township and Wharton; and the Somerset County municipality of Bernardsville.

Demographic characteristics
As of the 2020 United States census, the district had a population of 221,043, of whom 174,207 (78.8%) were of voting age. The racial makeup of the district was 151,305 (68.5%) White, 8,170 (3.7%) African American, 1,187 (0.5%) Native American, 14,367 (6.5%) Asian, 50 (0.0%) Pacific Islander, 21,482 (9.7%) from some other race, and 24,482 (11.1%) from two or more races. Hispanic or Latino of any race were 47,305 (21.4%) of the population. 

The district had high levels of income on average, but the communities of Dover, Mine Hill, Victory Gardens are well below the state average. The district had a high percentage of Hispanic residents, with Dover having some 60% of its residents as being of Hispanic origin.  

Although traditionally thought of as a Republican stronghold, the demographics of the district have trended more Democratic in recent years. At the time of the 2011 legislative apportionment, Republicans held a 16,737 vote (12.0%) registration advantage. By 2019, that advantage was down to 7,801 votes (4.9%). The 25th District had 174,014 registered voters as of December 1, 2021, of whom 60,881 (35.0%) were registered as unaffiliated, 57,063 (32.8%) were registered as Republicans, 54,279 (31.2%) were registered as Democrats, and 1,791 (1.0%) were registered to other parties.

Political representation
For the 2022–2023 session, the district is represented in the State Senate by Anthony M. Bucco (R, Boonton Township) and in the General Assembly by Brian Bergen (R, Denville Township) and Aura K. Dunn (R, Mendham Borough).

The district is split between New Jersey's 7th and New Jersey's 11th Congressional districts.

District composition since 1973
The first iteration of District 25 came in 1973 upon the creation of the statewide 40-district legislative map. The 25th at that time traveled from Maplewood along the western border of Essex County to Fairfield Township (also including North Caldwell, Passaic County's Wayne Township, and Lincoln Park and Pequannock Township in Morris County. In the next redistricting in 1981, the district became based through the center of Morris County running from Harding Township through Morristown, Dover, Boonton, and Jefferson Township. The shape of the district remained mostly the same in the 1991 redistricting picking up Mendham Township, Mount Arlington, and Roxbury Township, but losing Madison and Mountain Lakes.

Changes to the district made as part of the New Jersey Legislative apportionment in 2001, based on the results of the 2000 United States Census added Mountain Lakes Borough (from the 26th Legislative District) and removed Hanover Township (to the 26th Legislative District) and Harding Township (to the 21st Legislative District). As a consequence of the New Jersey Legislative apportionment in 2011, Jefferson Township and Rockaway Township were moved to District 26. The 25th District was shifted south and west, adding Morris County GOP strongholds Mendham Borough (from District 16), Chester Borough, Chester Township and Washington Township (from District 24); and Bernardsville in Somerset County (from District 16).

William E. Bishop was elected in a special election held on April 20, 1982, to fill the vacancy left by James J. Barry Jr., who had been named as Director of the New Jersey Division of Consumer Affairs by Governor of New Jersey Thomas Kean. Bishop was defeated by Morris County Freeholder Rodney Frelinghuysen and incumbent Arthur R. Albohn in the 1983 Republican primary for the full term.

In the 1993 general election, former Assemblymember Gordon MacInnes defeated Republican incumbent John H. Dorsey by nearly 300 votes, making him the first Democrat in 18 years to win a legislative seat in Morris County.

After Frelinghuysen took office in the United States House of Representatives in January 1995, Anthony R. Bucco was chosen by Morris County Republican county committee members to fill Frelinghuysen's vacant seat in the Assembly. Bucco and Michael Patrick Carroll won the six-way June 1995 Republican primary to fill the district's two Assembly ballot spots, which became open when Albohn decided against running for re-election for a ninth term of office. In this primary, the two winners defeated then Morris County Freeholder Chris Christie and future Assemblyman Rick Merkt. In 1997, Anthony R. Bucco left the Assembly to successfully contest the Democratic-held Senate seat, with Merkt taking the Assembly seat vacated by Bucco.

With Merkt running for the Republican nomination for governor in 2009, the 25th District saw a contested Republican primary with incumbent Michael Patrick Carroll facing Anthony M. Bucco and the younger Bucco's brother-in-law Douglas Cabana, a member of the Morris County Board of Chosen Freeholders. Bucco and Carroll won the two ballot spots and were elected in the general election.

In 2011, Michael Patrick Carroll and Tony Bucco retained their seats in the Assembly, defeating Democratic challengers Gale Heiss-Colucci and George Stafford, while Anthony R. Bucco retained his Senate seat over challenger Rick Thoeni. In 2013, with no Democratic challengers and only token opposition, all three incumbents sailed to victory, earning over 80% of the vote.

In 2017, in the closest race since the district was created in 1973, Anthony Bucco narrowly defeated Democratic challenger Lisa Bhimani by just over 2500 votes to retain his Senate seat. In the Assembly race, Carroll and the younger Bucco defeated Democratic challengers Thomas Moran and Richard Corcoran by a similar margin. In 2018, Carroll announced he would not seek re-election in 2019, choosing instead to run for Morris County surrogate.  On June 4, 2019, in the first contested Assembly primary in the district since 2009, Tony Bucco and Brian Bergen defeated Aura K. Dunn and John Barbarula to win the Republican nomination for General Assembly.

Senator Anthony R. Bucco died in September 2019. A special convention of the Republican County Committee members from the district met on October 15, 2019, and unanimously selected his son, Assemblyman Anthony M. "Tony" Bucco to fill his father's seat until a 2020 special election. Assemblyman Bucco resigned from the Assembly the day he was sworn into the Senate. Another special convention was then be held made up of the Republican County Committee members, in order to fill the vacant Assembly seat. At a November 21 convention, Aura K. Dunn was chosen to serve until the end of the current legislative session, January 14, 2020. Upon the start of the new session, Tony Bucco declined to be seated to the Assembly seat to which he was elected in November 2019 and a third convention was held on February 1, 2020, which unanimously selected Dunn to serve until a special election in November 2020.

Election history

Election results

Senate

General Assembly

References

Morris County, New Jersey
Somerset County, New Jersey
25